The Manipur High Court is the High Court of the state of Manipur, India.  It was established in 25 March 2013, after making suitable amendments in the Constitution of India and North-Eastern Areas (Re-organisation) Act, 1971. The seat of the High Court is at Imphal, the capital of Manipur. The first Chief Justice is Justice Abhay Manohar Sapre.  Earlier, a bench of the Gauhati High Court used to have jurisdiction over the state of Manipur.

List of Chief Justices

References

External links
 The High Court of Manipur

Government of Manipur
2013 establishments in Manipur
Courts and tribunals established in 2013